The Creighton Bluejays women's basketball team represents Creighton University in Omaha, Nebraska, United States. The school's team currently competes in the Big East after moving from the Missouri Valley Conference following the 2012–13 season.  The Bluejays had competed in the Missouri Valley since the 1992-1993 season.  The women’s basketball team began competing as an independent in 1973-1974 under coach Eddye McClure, which was their first winning season with an 11-6 record.  The Bluejays are currently coached by Jim Flanery.

NCAA tournament results
The Bluejays have appeared in seven NCAA Tournaments. Their record is 8–8.

WNIT and NWIT results
The Bluejays have appeared in eight Women's National Invitation Tournaments, and also appeared once in the WNIT's predecessor, the National Women's Invitational Tournament. Their combined record is 14–9.

Yearly records

References

External links